Bible translations into Geʽez, an ancient South Semitic language of the Ethiopian branch, date back to the 6th century at least, making them one of the world's oldest Bible translations.

Translations of the Bible in Ge'ez, in a predecessor of the Ge'ez script which did not possess vowels, were created between the 5th and 7th century, soon after the Christianization of Ethiopia in the 4th century. The milestones of the modern editions were the Roman edition of the New Testament in 1548 edited by Tasfa Seyon, which is the editio princeps, and the critical edition of the New Testament by Thomas P. Platt in 1830 (his edition of the Geʽez four Gospels was first published in 1826).

The Garima Gospels are the oldest translation of the Bible in Ge'ez and the world's earliest complete illustrated Christian manuscript. Monastic tradition holds that they were composed close to the year 500, a date supported by recent radiocarbon analysis; samples from Garima 2 proposed a date of  390–570, while counterpart dating of samples from Garima 1 proposed a date of  530–660.

The Garima Gospels is also thought to be the oldest surviving Geʽez manuscript.

Ge'ez Bible manuscripts existed until at least the late 17th century.

In 2009, the Ethiopian Catholic Church and the Ethiopian Orthodox Tewahedo Church associated themselves with the Bible Society of Ethiopia to produce a printed version of the Bible in Ge'ez. The New Testament was released in 2017.

References

Further reading 
 Piovanelli, Pierluigi. "Aksum and the Bible: Old Assumptions and New Perspectives." Aethiopica 21 (2018): 7-27. Open access
 
 
 Hannah, Darrell. "The Vorlage of the Ethiopic Version of the Epistula Apostolorum: Greek or Arabic?." Beyond Canon: Early Christianity and the Ethiopic Textual Tradition (2020): 97ff.
 
 Knibb, Michael A. 2000. Translating the Bible: The Ethiopic Version of the Old Testament, by Michael A. Knibb. The Schweich Lectures for 1995. New York: Oxford University Press for the British Academy. 
 Zuurmond, Rochus. "The Ethiopic Version of the New Testament." The Text of the New Testament in Contemporary Research: Essays on the Status Quaestionis (1995): 142-56.

External links 

 
 

Apocrypha
Christianity in Ethiopia
Bible versions and translations
Texts in Ge'ez